Gmina Szczawin Kościelny (1943-1945, German Schauenkirch) is a rural gmina (administrative district) in Gostynin County, Masovian Voivodeship, in east-central Poland.

Villages
Gmina Szczawin Kościelny contains the villages and settlements of Adamów, Annopol, Białka, Budki Suserskie, Budy Kaleńskie, Dobrów, Gołas, Gorzewo-Kolonia, Helenów, Helenów Słupski, Helenów Trębski, Holendry Dobrowskie, Janki, Jesionka, Józefków, Kaleń, Kamieniec, Krzymów, Kunki, Lubieniek, Mellerów, Misiadla, Modrzew, Mościska, Osowia, Pieryszew, Przychód, Reszki, Sewerynów, Słup, Smolenta, Staw, Stefanów Suserski, Suserz, Swoboda, Szczawin Borowy-Kolonia, Szczawin Borowy-Wieś, Szczawin Kościelny, Szczawinek, Teodorów, Trębki, Tuliska, Waliszew, Witoldów, Wola Trębska and Wola Trębska-Parcel.

Neighbouring gminas
Gmina Szczawin Kościelny is bordered by the gminas of Gąbin, Gostynin, Łąck, Oporów, Pacyna and Strzelce.

References
Polish official population figures 2006

External links

Szczawin Koscielny
Gostynin County